Legislative elections were held in Åland on 15 June 1960.

Results

References

Elections in Åland
Aland
1960 in Finland